Rahmatabad (also Romanized as Raḩmatābād; also known as Ḩasanābād-e Kohneh) is a village in Gol Banu Rural District, Pain Jam District, Torbat-e Jam County, Razavi Khorasan Province, Iran. At the 2006 census, its population was 1,808, in 366 families.

References 

Populated places in Torbat-e Jam County